Nima Javidi (Persian: نیما جاویدی, born 29 February 1980) is an Iranian film director and screenwriter. He is best known for his films Melbourne (2014) and The Warden (2019).

Filmography

Film

Home video

Awards and nominations

References

External links 

 

Iranian film directors
Iranian screenwriters
Crystal Simorgh recipients
People from Bojnord
Living people
1980 births